The Kentucky River is a tributary of the Ohio River,  long, in the U.S. Commonwealth of Kentucky. The river and its tributaries drain much of the central region of the state, with its upper course passing through the coal-mining regions of the Cumberland Mountains, and its lower course passing through the Bluegrass region in the north central part of the state. It supplies drinking water to about one-sixth of the population of the Commonwealth of Kentucky.

The river is no longer navigable above Lock 4 at Frankfort. Concrete bulkheads have been poured behind the upper lock gates of Locks 5-14 to strengthen the weakest link in the dam structures. All 14 dams are now under the management of the state-run Kentucky River Authority. The primary importance of the locks today is to maintain a pool that allows the city of Lexington to draw its drinking water from the river.

Winchester, Beattyville, Irvine, Richmond, Lancaster, Nicholasville, Harrodsburg, Wilmore, Versailles, Lawrenceburg, and Frankfort also draw water from the river for their municipal water supplies. It is estimated that more than 700,000 people depend on the river for water.

Description

The main stem of the Kentucky River is formed in Eastern Kentucky at Beattyville, in Lee County, by the confluence of the North and South Forks at about  elevation. The Middle Fork enters the North Fork about five miles above Beattyville. The river flows generally northwest, in a highly meandering course through the mountains, through the Daniel Boone National Forest, past Irvine and Boonesborough, flowing southwest and passing south of Lexington, then north through Frankfort. It joins the Ohio at Carrollton.

At High Bridge, it is joined by the Dix River. At Frankfort, it is joined by Benson Creek; that confluence was the junction of Kentucky's three original counties.

Forks

North Fork
It rises on the northwest side of Pine Mountain, in the Appalachians of extreme southeastern Kentucky, in eastern Letcher County near the Virginia state line in Payne Gap, near the intersection of US 23 and US 119. It flows generally northwest, in a winding course through the mountainous Cumberland Plateau, past Whitesburg, Hazard and Jackson. It receives Rockhouse Creek at Blackey near its source. It receives Troublesome Creek at Haddix, southeast of Jackson. Three miles upstream from its confluence with the South Fork, it receives the Middle Fork. It joins the South Fork to form the Kentucky at Beattyville. At Airdale, the river has a mean average discharge of approximately 863 cubic feet per second, per data collected during the period 1930-1942.

Middle Fork
At Buckhorn, it is impounded to form the Buckhorn Lake reservoir. At Tallega, the river has a mean annual discharge of 792 cubic feet per second.

South Fork
Bullskin Creek enters just downstream. The South Fork flows generally north in a highly meandering course through the mountainous Cumberland Plateau region. It joins the North Fork to form the Kentucky at Beattyville. At Booneville, the river has a mean annual discharge of 1,052 cubic feet per second.

Floods 
Kentucky River flooding has been recorded since the early 1800s. Swiss immigrant and lock-keeper, Frank Wurtz, recorded the floods from 1867 on and spoke with local farmers to learn of earlier ones. They told him of great floods in 1817, 1832, 1847, and 1854. Wurtz documented the floods of 1867, 1880, and 1883, which he claims was five feet higher than the high tide of the 1847 flood. The waters of the 1883 flood washed his post away.

On January 1, 1919, the waters rose 10 feet in ten hours at Frankfort, causing damage to many smaller towns along the river. In November of the same year, the waters rose 3 feet in one hour at Frankfort. In 1920, flooding caused the sewers in Frankfort to back up. There was also major flooding in early 1924 and late December 1926.

Floods hit Kentucky and the South in 1927, causing widespread damage in the Kentucky River basin, in communities such as Neon, Whitesburg, and Hazard. Hundreds of people were forced from their homes.

Politics of flooding in the 1930s 
Throughout the 1930s, the area, already suffering from the economic depression, had to deal with several floods, including a particularly bad one in 1936. As the Ohio river flooded that year, it backed into the lower Kentucky. In all,   of the Ohio valley were flooded.

The severe 1937 flooding, exacerbated by cold weather, resulted in civil unrest. With the downstairs population moving up a floor, racial tensions erupted. 24 prisoners tried to escape, but after a warning shot was fired, only one man left. No clean water or food was left in the prison, so authorities moved the population of 2,900 to the "feeble-minded institute" on the hill next to the prison. Carpenters were brought in to build small, temporary housing units. Due to the unrest of the prison riots, the National Guard was brought in to oversee the makeshift prison. The prisoners considered to be too dangerous for the setting were sent to Lawrenceburg and Lexington. Governor Happy Chandler successfully pushed for a new reformatory to be built in LaGrange.

While the public was still dealing with the effects of the flooding, Kentucky Utilities opened the Dix Dam spillways, which added more height to the flood waters. When it was turned off,  extra of water were added. In Mercer county, the ferry connecting to the shore of Woodford washed away and was never replaced. A flood in 1939 rose slightly higher in Hazard than the flood in 1937.

Residents in the Kentucky River watershed demanded the federal government do more to control floods. For a variety of reasons, many people protested this.

In 1939, President Franklin Roosevelt signed the Flood Control Act of 1938, which authorized construction or study of many dams and reservoirs by the U.S. Army Corps of Engineers. Only two small lakes, Carr Fork and Buckhorn, were created in the Kentucky River watershed. The most controversial project, a Red River dam that would have flooded most of the river's scenic gorge, was finally abandoned in 1975. By that time, more people understood the widespread environmental and habitat effects of such dam construction and were less willing to support them.

Recreation
The river provides excellent fishing. The largest goldeye ever taken in the state of Kentucky was caught in the Kentucky River.

See also

List of rivers of Kentucky

Notes

References
 Clark, Thomas D. "The Kentucky". The Rivers of America Series, 1942. reprinted 1969 by Henry Clay Press
 Collins, Robert F. "A History of the Daniel Boone National Forest". (1975)
 Arthur Benke & Colbert Cushing, Rivers of North America. Elsevier Academic Press, 2005 
 Rhodes, Captain Rick, The Ohio River --In American History and Voyaging on Today's River has a section on the Kentucky River; Heron Island Guides, 2007,

External links

Kentucky River Authority
NWS: Kentucky River Watershed Watch
Kentucky River Museum in Boonesbourough
Kentucky River Water Quality
Kentucky River Palisades
Flood Inundation Maps for a 6.5-mile Reach of the Kentucky River at Frankfort, Kentucky United States Geological Survey

 
Rivers of Kentucky
Tributaries of the Ohio River
Rivers of Madison County, Kentucky
Rivers of Lee County, Kentucky
Rivers of Estill County, Kentucky
Rivers of Jessamine County, Kentucky
Rivers of Mercer County, Kentucky
Rivers of Woodford County, Kentucky
Rivers of Anderson County, Kentucky
Rivers of Franklin County, Kentucky
Rivers of Carroll County, Kentucky
Rivers of Letcher County, Kentucky
Rivers of Perry County, Kentucky
Rivers of Breathitt County, Kentucky
Rivers of Leslie County, Kentucky
Rivers of Clay County, Kentucky
Mississippi River watershed